Chau, Beyond the Lines (previously known as: War Within the Walls) is a 2015 American short-documentary film about a 16-year-old disabled by the effects of Agent Orange, who aspires to become an artist and clothing designer. It is directed by Courtney Marsh and produced by Jerry Franck and Marsh.

Chau, Beyond the Lines was shortlisted with nine other documentaries from 74 entries submitted to 88th Academy Awards in Documentary Short Subject category, and eventually received a nomination.

Background
The documentary shows the lasting effects of Agent Orange, a chemical sprayed over the Vietnam jungles during the Vietnam War by the United States to deprive the Northern Vietnamese Army of their food and cover. After 20 years of war, Chau, a teenager living in a care center, is disabled by the effects of this chemical. With a rare disability in his arms and legs, Chau is repeatedly told that his dream of becoming a professional artist is impossible. Filming extended over 8 years.

Awards

 2015: Academy Awards – Nomination – Best Documentary – Short Subject.
 2015: Austin Film Festival – Grand Jury Award – Best Documentary Short Film
 2015: USA Film Festival –  National Jury Award – Documentary Short Film
 2015: Fort Lauderdale International Film Festival – Grand Jury Award – Best Documentary Short Film
 2016: Irvine International Film Festival - Grand Jury Award - Best Documentary Short Film

References

External links
 
 
 Chau, beyond the Lines at 7thART.com 
 Chau, beyond the Lines at courtneynmarsh.com

2015 films
2010s war films
American short documentary films
Documentary films about the Vietnam War
Documentary films about children with disability
Aftermath of the Vietnam War
2015 short documentary films
2010s American films